Saatluy may refer to:
 Saatluy Kuh
 Saatluy-e Beyglar